Regional elections were held in Belgium, to choose representatives in the regional councils of Flanders, Wallonia, Brussels and the German-speaking Community on 13 June 1999. The regional elections were held on the same day as the European elections and the federal elections.

Flemish Parliament

The incumbent Flemish Government consisted of the Christian People's Party (CVP) and the Socialist Party (SP), led by Minister-President Luc Van den Brande (CVP). Following this election, a government was formed without the Christian democrats. New Minister-President  (Flemish Liberals and Democrats (VLD)) led a "purple-green-yellow" coalition of his own liberal VLD, the Socialist Party, Agalev and the nationalist People's Union (VU-ID). This change mirrored what happened on the federal level, where the  Government was succeeded by the Guy Verhofstadt Government.

By constituency

These were only the second direct election for the Flemish Parliament, but the last to use arrondissement-based constituencies. They were merged into provincial constituencies starting from the 2004 election.

Walloon Regional Parliament

Brussels Regional Parliament

Council of the German-speaking Community

External links 
 Belgian government election database

1999
1999 elections in Belgium
June 1999 events in Europe